Villahermosa is a municipality located in the Province of Ciudad Real, Castile-La Mancha, Spain. It has a population of 2,559.

The Lagunas de Ruidera are located within this town's municipal term.

Municipalities in the Province of Ciudad Real